Jag Panzer is an American power metal band from Colorado Springs, Colorado.

History 
Jag Panzer came together in late 1981, being inspired by the onslaught of the new wave of British heavy metal. The original line-up consisted of Harry Conklin on vocals (later nicknamed the "Tyrant"), Mark Briody, the sole guitarist of the group in its first incarnation, John Tetley (bassist) and Rick Hilyard (drummer). The band was known as Tyrant in its first incarnation, but they soon had to change the name, because another band already existed in California with that name.

They saw a poster featuring a German World War II tank, named Jagdpanzer literally "hunting tank" in German, but actually referring to what in English would be called a tank destroyer, which they decided to name their band after. They were, however, unable to pronounce the name correctly and as a result, dropped the letter "D" from the name and simply called it Jag Panzer. The band, who were all in their late teens at the time, played at local venues in the Denver club circuit, and recorded an EP in 1983, later known as Tyrants. In early 1984, the band recruited Joey Tafolla, a native of California, and promptly recorded their first album, Ample Destruction. The album was released in August of that year by the independent record label Azra Records. The album was an underground hit in the United States, and in Europe and Japan it was available on import only.

After the release of the album, the band relocated to Southern California. Tafolla quit the band in 1986, releasing a solo album, Out of the Sun, in 1987, while Conklin played with Riot for a brief period in the late 1980s, before forming his own band, Titan Force. Without the two key members of the Ample Destruction line-up, Jag Panzer, or more accurately Briody and Tetley, as Hilyard had also been replaced by Reynold 'Butch' Carlson (who also left in 1986 along with Tafolla), revamped the band by recruiting vocalist Bob Parduba, and guitarist Christian Lasegue.

The Swedish born drummer, Rikard Stjernquist, was added to the line-up and the band proceeded to record the follow-up to their debut LP. The album was recorded in late 1987, but never got an official release.

By 1994, the band had reunited, this time with vocalist Daniel J. Conca, with Tetley and Briody on bass and guitar. Guitarist Chris Hostka and drummer Rikard Stjernquist were employed on their first official album in almost 10 years, Dissident Alliance. It was released by the German indie label Rising Sun.

The next album was on Century Media, The Fourth Judgement, which came out in late 1997, followed by Age of Mastery (1998). Jag Panzer sought to tackle more ambitious territory for their next album, with Thane to the Throne, a concept album about William Shakespeare's Macbeth.

Mechanized Warfare was released in 2001, then the band released a double album in 2003 that featured previously unreleased tracks as well as songs from their first LP. Decade of the Nail Spiked Bat came out in 2003, and featured re-recorded and remixed old material. In 2004, the band released Casting the Stones. The previously unreleased Chain of Command album was remixed and was issued in 2004 as a limited edition.

In 2008, Chris Broderick left the band to join Megadeth, and was replaced by Christian Lasegue, who handled lead guitar duties on Chain of Command.

On December 23, 2008, Briody made a post on the band's official forum stating that the title of their next album would be The Scourge of the Light. On the official site, the band announced that SPV/Sony planned to release the album in February 2011. The album was released March 8, 2011.

Two weeks after its release, The Scourge of the Light placed at No. 117 on the Billboard New Artist Chart, making the album Jag Panzer's most successful to date.

On July 25, 2011, the band announced that they are to disband due to the rising costs of touring.

Jag Panzer played a special early days show tour with Joey Tafolla for the first time in Europe. They played two shows in Greece, one in Austria and they headlined the Keep It True Festival XVII on April 25, 2014, in Germany.

High Roller Records released a 4-LP vinyl box set entitled Historical Battles – The Early Years, on April 19, 2013, limited to 500 copies.

By 2014, Jag Panzer had commenced working on their tenth album for a near future release, also featuring lead guitarist Joey Tafolla for the first time since 1997's The Fourth Judgement. Jag Panzer announced in August 2014 that it was looking for a new vocalist. However, it now appears that Harry Conklin has rejoined the group as of March 2015. In October 2015 the band announced their new album title would be The Deviant Chord and would be released sometime in 2017. The album, which was released by SPV/Steamhammer on September 29, 2017, included a cover version of the Irish folk song "Foggy Dew".

Jag Panzer's eleventh studio album, The Hallowed, is due for release sometime in 2023.

Members

Current 
Harry "The Tyrant" Conklin – lead vocals (1981–1985, 1996–2011, 2013–present)
Mark Briody – rhythm guitar, keyboards (1981–1988, 1994–2011, 2013–present)
Ken Rodarte - lead guitar, backing vocals (touring 2018-2022, 2022-present)
John Tetley – bass, backing vocals (1981–1988, 1994–2011, 2013–present)
Rikard Stjernquist – drums (1986–1988, 1994–2011, 2013–present)

Former 
Rick Hilyard – drums (1981–1984)
Reynold 'Butch' Carlson – drums (1984–1986)
Bob Parduba – lead vocals (1987–1988)
Daniel J. Conca – lead vocals (1994; died 2004)
Chris Kostka (Hostka) – lead guitar (1994)
Chris Broderick – lead guitar (1997–2008)
Christian Lasegue – lead guitar (1986–1990, 2008–2011)
Joey Tafolla – lead guitar (1984–1986, 1994–1997, 2013–2017)

Touring 
Aric Avina – bass (2015–present)
Ken Rodarte – lead guitar (2018–present)

Timeline

Discography

Studio albums 
Ample Destruction (1984)
Dissident Alliance (1994)
The Fourth Judgement (1997)
The Age of Mastery (1998)
Thane to the Throne (2000)
Mechanized Warfare (2001)
Chain of Command (2004, inedits in 1987)
Casting the Stones (2004)
The Scourge of the Light (2011)
 The Deviant Chord (2017)
The Hallowed (2023)

Other releases 
Tyrants (EP, 1983)
Death Row (single, 1983)
Demo 85 (1985)
Demo 86 (1986)
Shadow Thief (demo, 1986)
Jeffrey Behind the Gate (single, 1994)
The Return (demo, 1996)
The Era of Kings and Conflict (DVD, 2002)
Decade of the Nail Spiked Bat (best of/compilation, 2003)
The Wreck of the Edmund Fitzgerald (single, 2005)
Historical Battles – The Early Years (LP box set, 2013)

References

External links 

American power metal musical groups
Heavy metal musical groups from Colorado
Century Media Records artists
Musical groups established in 1981
Musical groups disestablished in 1988
Musical groups reestablished in 1994
Musical groups disestablished in 2011
Musical groups reestablished in 2013
Musical quintets